The 1st Armored Brigade Combat Team, 34th Infantry Division is an Armored Brigade Combat Team of the Minnesota Army National Guard. It is part of the 34th Infantry Division.

Early history
The lineage of Headquarters, 1st ABCT, dates back to the American Civil War. A volunteer militia unit, the Stillwater Guards, had been enrolled into Minnesota’s organized militia, and in 1861 was called to federal service as Company B, 1st Minnesota Volunteer Infantry Regiment.
The 1st Minnesota Regiment was reorganized as 1st Battalion, Minnesota Volunteer Infantry in 1864. In February 1865, the battalion was again reformed as the 1st Minnesota Infantry Regiment. The regiment was mustered out in July 1865, following the end of the war.

Spanish–American War
In 1883, the Minnesota National Guard organized a new Stillwater unit, Company K, 1st Infantry Regiment. This unit served in the Philippines during the Spanish–American War when the regiment was federalized as the 13th Minnesota Volunteer Infantry.

In 1912, Company K, 1st Infantry Regiment was re-designated Company K, 3rd Infantry Regiment. The unit was called to federal service in 1916 during the Pancho Villa Expedition.

World War I
Company K was called to federal service and reorganized in 1917 as Battery F, 125th Field Artillery. The 125th Field Artillery deployed to France and participated in World War I by providing individual replacements to other units. The regiment was demobilized at Camp Dodge, Iowa in 1919.
In 1921 a post-World War I reorganization of the National Guard caused Battery F to be reconfigured as Headquarters, 1st Battalion, 135th Infantry Regiment and Howitzer Company, 135th Infantry.

World War II
The 1st Battalion Headquarters was re-designated in 1925 as Company A, 135th Infantry, and in 1939 Howitzer Company was reorganized as Company D, 135th Infantry. Companies A and D were activated for World War II and served in the European Theater from February, 1941 to November, 1945.

Korean War
In 1946, the 135th Infantry was moved from the 35th Infantry Division to the 47th, and Companies A and D were reorganized as Headquarters Company, 1st Battalion, 135th Infantry and Antitank Company, 135th Infantry.

In 1948, Antitank Company was re-designated Heavy Mortar Company, 135th Infantry. In 1951 Headquarters Company, 1st Battalion and Heavy Mortar Company were called to federal service with the 135th Infantry, which was organized with the 45th Infantry Division during the Korean War. They were released from federal service in 1954.

Late 20th century

In 1959, the 1st Battalion Headquarters and Heavy Mortar Company were consolidated as Headquarters Company, 1st Battle Group, 135th Infantry Regiment, 47th Infantry Division. The 1st Battle Group Headquarters was reconfigured in 1963 as Headquarters Company, 1st Battalion, 135th Infantry. In 1968, the 1st Battalion Headquarters was re-designated Headquarters, 1st Brigade, 47th Infantry Division.

In 1991, the 47th Division was reflagged as the 34th Division, and the 1st Brigade, including its Headquarters, was reallocated to the 34th Infantry Division.

21st century
Since the September 11, 2001 terrorist attacks, units and individuals of 1st Brigade, 34th Division have participated in operations including homeland defense missions, the war in Iraq and the War in Afghanistan.

In 2006, the Army’s conversion to modular brigades led to 1st Brigade’s reorganization as 1st Armored Brigade Combat Team.

From 2009 to 2012 the 1st ABCT deployed to Southwest Asia and conducted security operations in Kuwait and Iraq as part of Operation New Dawn.

In 2017, 1/34th ABCT was planned to be in the Ready state for deployment, having spent two years preparing for its National Training Center rotation 16-07.

As of 2020, 1/34 ABCT was once again sent to the National Training Center in Ft. Irwin, CA to become certified for deployment. This was an extra challenge due to the 2020 COVID-19 global outbreak but the brigade still excelled in their training.

Campaign participation credit
Civil War – Bull Run, Peninsula, Valley, Antietam, Fredericksburg, Gettysburg, Petersburg, Virginia in 1861, Virginia in 1862, Virginia in 1863, Virginia in 1864, Virginia in 1865
War With Spain – Manila
Philippine Insurrection – Luzon, San Isidoro
World War I
World War II – Tunisia, Naples-Foggia, Anzio, Rome-Arno, North Apennines, Po Valley

Decorations
Streamer without inscription (World War I)
French Croix de Guerre with Palm (World War II)
Streamer embroidered BELVEDERE (World War II)

Structure 
 Headquarters, 1st Armored Brigade Combat Team (MN ARNG)
 Headquarters and Headquarters Company (HHC), in Rosemount, Minnesota
 1st Squadron, 94th Cavalry Regiment (Armored Recon), in Duluth, Minnesota 
1st Battalion, 145th Armored Regiment of the Ohio Army National Guard
 1st Battalion, 194th Armor Regiment, in Brainerd, Minnesota 
 2nd Battalion, 136th Infantry Regiment, in Moorhead, Minnesota
 1st Battalion, 125th Field Artillery Regiment (1-125th FAR), in New Ulm
 334th Brigade Engineer Battalion (334th BEB), in Stillwater, Minnesota
 134th Brigade Support Battalion (134th BSB), at Camp Ripley

References

External resources
1st Armored Brigade Combat Team  at Minnesota National Guard

Infantry 034 01
Infantry 034 01
Armor 034 01
1